EN 590 is a standard published by the European Committee for Standardization that describes the physical properties that all automotive diesel fuel must meet if it is to be sold in the European Union and several other European countries.

Based on 98/70/EG it allows the blending of up to 7% fatty acid methyl ester biodiesel with 'conventional' diesel - a 7:93 mix.

History 
The EN 590 had been introduced along with the European emission standards. With each of its revisions the EN 590 had been adapted to lower the sulphur content of diesel fuel - since 2007 this is called ultra low sulphur diesel as the former function of sulphur as a lubricant is absent (and needs to be replaced by additives).

Generally applicable requirements and test methods

GOST R 32511-2013

Winter Diesel 
The standard EN 590 puts diesel fuel into two groups destined for specific climatic environments. For the "temperate" climatic zones the standard defines six classes from  A to F. For the "arctic" climatic zones the standard defines five classes from  0 to 4.

Many countries in Europe require diesel fuel to meet a specific class in winter times. In Central and Western Europe the Winter Diesel (Winterdiesel, diesel d'hiver) must meet Class F conditions at least from the beginning of December to the end of February. During a transitional period (mostly October and April) a lower Class must be met. In the Scandinavian countries the Winter Diesel (Vinterdiesel) must meet Class 2 conditions. Some mineral groups offer both types commonly known as Winter Diesel (Winterdiesel, diesel d'hiver) and Arctic Diesel (Polardiesel, diesel polaires).

See also 
 EN 14214
 European emission standards
 Hydrogenated vegetable oil
 Ultra-low-sulfur diesel

References

External links 
Standard.
First Texas Energy Corporation
National D2 Diesel
 
00590
Diesel fuel